Abducted may refer to:

Film and television
 Abducted (2013 film), directed by Glen Scantlebury & Lucy Phillips
 "Abducted" (Invader Zim), an episode of animated television series Invader Zim
 Abducted: The Carlina White Story, a 2012 American film
 "The Abducted", a 2010 episode of television series Fringe
 Abducted, an alternative title for the 2012 tele-movie Layover with Lauren Holly
 Abducted, a 2020 American film with Scout Taylor-Compton

Music
 Abducted, a 1996 album by Hypocrisy
 "Abducted", a song by Cults from their 2011 album Cults

See also
 
 Abduction (disambiguation)
 Abductor (disambiguation)